Karen Whitefield (born 8 January 1970, Bellshill) is a Scottish Labour politician.  She was the Member of the Scottish Parliament (MSP) for the Airdrie and Shotts constituency from 1999 to 2011.

Political career
Prior to her election as MSP, she worked as a personal assistant to Rachel Squire MP.

MSP for Airdrie and Shotts: 1999–2011
She was elected as MSP for Airdrie and Shotts at the 1999 Scottish Parliament general election. As an MSP, she chaired the Parliament's Education Committee, where she used her casting vote to reject the student graduate endowment bill, a Scottish National Party (SNP) flagship policy. It had the backing of the Liberal Democrats and SNP members, but not the Labour or Conservative members of the committee. The bill was eventually passed through the Scottish Parliament by a vote of 67 to 61. Whitefield was Scottish Labour's shadow Minister for Children in the Scottish Parliament, and Convener of the Cross-Party Group on Diabetes under Iain Gray. At the 2011 Scottish Parliament election, she lost her seat to the SNP's Alex Neil, one of nine Labour MSPs to lose their constituency seats after holding them since the first elections to the Scottish Parliament in 1999.

Falkirk PPC: 2015
Following the resignation of sitting MP Eric Joyce (and the controversial and flawed 2013 Labour Party Falkirk candidate selection), in a re-run in which all the previous candidates were excluded on 8 December 2013, Whitefield was selected to contest the Falkirk constituency at the 2015 UK general election. In the event, the SNP landslide swept Scotland, including Falkirk, and Whitehead was unsuccessful in being elected.

Labour Leadership 2021 campaign
Following the resignation of Scottish Labour leader Richard Leonard, Whitefield chaired Anas Sarwar's leadership campaign.  Sarwar was subsequently voted in as leader of Scottish Labour.

Personal life
After her unseating in the 2011 Scottish Parliament election, she subsequently became a campaign officer at USDAW.  She is single and lives in the village of Glenmavis - a satellite village of Airdrie.

References

External links 
 
 Karen Whitefield  profile at the site of Scottish Labour

1970 births
Living people
People from Bellshill
Labour MSPs
Members of the Scottish Parliament 1999–2003
Members of the Scottish Parliament 2003–2007
Members of the Scottish Parliament 2007–2011
Female members of the Scottish Parliament
20th-century Scottish women politicians
Politicians from North Lanarkshire